Arthrochaete is a genus of green algae, in the family Chaetophoraceae.

References

Chaetophorales genera
Chaetophoraceae